USS APL-26 is an APL-17-class barracks ship of the United States Navy.

Construction and career 
The ship was laid down on 24 July 1944, by the Pollock-Stockton Shipbuilding Co. and launched on 29 December 1944. She was commissioned on 18 January 1946.

She was decommissioned in 1946 and put into the reserve fleet.

The ship was then sent to Vietnam by 1967 during the Vietnam War. She took part in several major battles during the war from the Tet Offensive until the ending of the war.

In March 1971, the ship was transferred to the South Vietnam and renamed HQ-9050. APL-27 was also transferred with the name HQ-9051.

In April 1975, North Vietnamese troops captured the ship and her fate is unknown.

Awards 

 Combat Action Ribbon
 Presidential Unit Citation (2 awards)
 Navy Unit Commendation (3 awards)
 American Campaign Medal
 World War II Victory Medal
 National Defense Service Medal
 Vietnam Service Medal (14 awards)
 Republic of Vietnam Gallantry Cross Unit Citation
 Republic of Vietnam Civil Action Medal (with Palm clasp)
 Republic of Vietnam Campaign Medal

References 

 

 

Barracks ships of the United States Navy
Ships built in Stockton, California
1944 ships
Ships transferred from the United States Navy to the Republic of Vietnam Navy
Ships of the Vietnam People's Navy
Vietnam War auxiliary ships of the United States